Ann Barrett OBE (born 27 February 1943), is Emeritus Professor of Oncology in the University of East Anglia, England, and formerly deputy dean of the School of Medicine and lead clinician for oncology at the Norfolk and Norwich University Hospital NHS Trust.  She was awarded an OBE in 2010 for services to medicine. She is also a fellow of the Royal College of Surgeons in Ireland.

Professor Barrett was an undergraduate at St Bartholomew's Hospital in London and did her postgraduate training at University College Hospital, the Middlesex Hospital, and the Westminster Hospital.  Following that she spent a year in Paris at the Fondation Curie and l’Institut Gustav Roussy before returning to the Royal Marsden Hospital for ten years, first as lecturer, and then senior lecturer and consultant with a particular interest in paediatric oncology and cancer in young people.  This was the time of the earliest bone marrow transplantation work, and she produced the first UK technique for whole body irradiation.  During this time she produced a textbook called Practical Radiotherapy Planning which is widely used throughout the world, a fourth edition of which was published in June 2009, and Cancer in Children, now in its 5th edition.

She then moved to Glasgow to a new chair of oncology at the Beatson Oncology Centre – the second largest cancer centre in the UK. In 1986 she joined the team setting up the new medical School in Norwich. She played a role in the teaching of the communications skills, both in the university and on the NHS national communication skills course for senior cancer physicians.

She has served on government commissions and groups including the National Radiotherapy Advisory Group, which contributed to the cancer reform strategy. She was Registrar and then Vice President of the Royal College of Radiologists, President of the European Society for Therapeutic Radiation Oncology and a member of the International Society of Paediatric Oncology.  She is the author of more than 150 papers and five textbooks, including the Oxford Desktop Reference in Oncology.

She has received awards from the American College of Radiology, the American Society for Therapeutic Radiation Oncology, honorary fellowship of the Royal College of Surgeons in Ireland, the President's medal of the RCR and a lifetime achievement award from ESTRO. She was elected Fellow of the Academy of Medical Sciences in 1998. She was a trustee of the Big C cancer charity in Norwich with particular responsibility for the Big C Family Information and Support Centre. She was chair of the Board of Trustees of the ACE Foundation at Stapleford Granary, Cambridge from 2017–2019.

References

1943 births
Living people
British oncologists
Women oncologists
Academics of the University of East Anglia
Officers of the Order of the British Empire
Alumni of University College London
Academy of Medical Science